, or simply Hagemaru, is a Japanese manga series written and illustrated by Shinbo Nomura. The series was published in the Shogakukan magazine CoroCoro Comic from 1985 to 1995. It tells the story of a young boy named Hagemaru and his ideas for saving money.

Premise 
The light-hearted story revolves around a young boy named Hagemaru with notably thick eyebrows and an unashamed positive and upbeat attitude. It spreads focus on his greedy family and the slice of life adventures he has with his schoolmates, typically his best friend and teacher who are irked by Hagemaru's schemes and disruptive demeanor.

Cast 
Noriko Tsukase as Hagemaru (episodes 1 – 37)
Kazuko Sugiyama as Hagemaru (episodes 38 – 52)
Jun'ichi Kanemaru as Masaru Kondou
Naoki Makishima as Pesu
Ginzô Matsuo as Homework Mask
Mariko Mukai as Aiko Hageda
Riyako Nagao as Kurumi
Ken'ichi Ogata as Yuji Hageda
Tomoko Ohtsuka as Mrs. Kondou
Yoshino Takamori as Sakiki Sakura

Media

Anime 
Due to the popularity of the manga in Japan, an anime adaptation was produced by Shin-Ei Animation in 1988. It was directed by Hiroshi Sasagawa and was broadcast by TV Asahi from March 3, 1988, to October 6, 1989. The 58 episode anime series also became a big hit, and, because of its popularity, a game was also created for the Family Computer. Since then, Tsurupika Hagemaru has been aired all around the world. 

In India, it was titled Hagemaru by Pogo TV and was dubbed into Hindi and a few other languages like Tamil and Telugu. The show later aired on Hungama TV from 10 April 2020 with the official title The Hagemaru Show.  

The English dub of Hagemaru is considered lost media.

In Malaysia, it is aired by Astro Ceria. The official English title is Hagemaru the Bald One.  

A 3D cartoon, intended as a soft reboot, was slated for 2021 but production status and release are still unknown.

Accolades 
Tsurupika Hagemaru received the Shogakukan Manga Award for children's manga in 1987.

References

External links
 

1985 manga
1988 anime television series debuts
1989 Japanese television series endings
Anime series based on manga
Children's manga
Comedy anime and manga
CoroCoro Comic
Shin-Ei Animation
Shogakukan franchises
Shogakukan manga
Shōnen manga
TV Asahi original programming
Winners of the Shogakukan Manga Award for children's manga